Harrison Township is an inactive township in Scotland County, in the U.S. state of Missouri.

Harrison Township was erected in 1844, taking its name from President William Henry Harrison.

References

Townships in Missouri
Townships in Scotland County, Missouri